Sir John Alfred Arnesby Brown  (29 March 1866 in Nottingham – 16 November 1955 in Haddiscoe, Norfolk) was an English landscape artist, "one of the leading British landscape artists of the 20th century" and best known for his impressionistic depictions of pastoral landscapes, often featuring cattle.

Arnesby Brown first studied at the Nottingham School of Art in the late 1890s. He has been called "the artist Nottingham forgot", with little remaining reference to him in Nottingham.

He later studied at the Bushey School of Art in London for four years from 1889. After exhibiting at the Royal Academy for the first time in 1890, he became an elected Associate there in 1903. In 1886 he married Mia Edwards (1870–1931), a painter who studied at Bushey under Sir Hubert von Herkomer. They lived in Norfolk and St Ives, Cornwall. Arnesby Brown was knighted in 1938.

He died in 1955, having not painted since 1942 due to blindness. He is buried in the cemetery of the Parish Church of St Mary in his hometown of Haddiscoe, Norfolk.

His brother Eric Brown (1877–1939) was the first director of the National Gallery of Canada, from 1912 till 1939.

Notes

External links
 
 Profile on Royal Academy of Arts Collections
 A listing for Brown's grave

1866 births
1955 deaths
19th-century English painters
English male painters
20th-century English painters
Royal Academicians
St Ives artists
Burials in Norfolk
20th-century English male artists
19th-century English male artists